Pavlina Stoyanova-Nola (born 14 July 1974) is a former tennis player who played for both Bulgaria (up to May 2001) and New Zealand (since June 2001) in her professional career.

Tennis career
Nola turned professional in 1995. She reached her career high ranking of No. 68 in the world on 14 May 2001. The best singles result of her career was finishing runner-up to Henrieta Nagyová at a WTA tournament in Palermo where she lost 3–6, 5–7. She also one won doubles title at the same tournament two years previously with Elena Pampoulova-Wagner. She played her last match in 2002, losing in the first round of the 2002 Australian Open to Janette Husárová.

Captain of Campbells Bay Tennis Club – Chelsea Cup team 2010 —
Pavlina Nola was Captain of Campbell's Bay Tennis Club Chelsea Cup team in 2010. The Chelsea Cup is the premier club tennis league competition for North Shore City in New Zealand. Campbells Bay Tennis Club is a large tennis club based in the best location on the shore.

Pavlina was successful winning captain leading a team consisting of Franziska Etzel, Kairangi Vano, Vicki Wild and Charlotte Roberts. Such was Pavlina's dominance in the competition that in the nine matches she ended with astonishing statistics of playing nine matches and winning 108 games and giving the opposition only 14 games.

WTA career finals

Singles: 1 (1 runner–up)

Doubles: 1 (1 title)

ITF Circuit finals

Singles: 12 (7 titles, 5 runner–ups)

Doubles: 11 (8 titles, 3 runner–ups)

Fed Cup
Pavlina Nola debuted for the Bulgaria Fed Cup team in 1995. Since then, she has a 4–4 singles record and a 1–3 doubles record (5–7 overall).

Singles (4–4)

Doubles (1–3)

 RR = Round Robin
 PPO = Promotion Play-Off

Grand Slam singles performance timeline

External links
 
 
 

1974 births
Living people
Bulgarian emigrants to New Zealand
Bulgarian female tennis players
Naturalised citizens of New Zealand
New Zealand female tennis players
Sportspeople from Varna, Bulgaria
Tennis players from Auckland